Remick Ridge Vineyards is a California-based vineyard and winery owned and operated by the Smothers Brothers. It is a monopole vineyard for Arrowood Vineyards and Winery in the Sonoma Valley. The setting of this viticulture operation is on a ridge of the northern Sonoma Mountains above Sonoma Creek. The name Remick is the maiden name of the brothers' mother. It was established in 1977.

See also
Sonoma Mountain
Wine Country
List of celebrities who own wineries and vineyards

References

External links
Arrowood Vineyards

Wineries in Sonoma County
Food and drink companies established in 1977
1977 establishments in California